Honghe County is located in Honghe Hani and Yi Autonomous Prefecture, Yunnan province, China.

Administrative divisions
In the present,Honghe County has 5 towns and 8 townships. 
5 towns

8 townships

Climate

References

External links
Honghe County Official Website

County-level divisions of Honghe Prefecture